Richard Charles Atkins (April 23, 1936 – November 13, 1966) was an American racing driver from Oakland, California.

Atkins came up in sprint cars and won the Turkey Night Grand Prix in 1965 and was rewarded by race promoter J. C. Agajanian with a chance to race in the USAC National Championship in 1966. He failed to qualify for the 1966 Indianapolis 500, but finished fourth at Trenton Speedway in September then won on the dirt oval at Sacramento in October, for his first "big car" win. However, he was killed just a month later in a sprint car crash at Ascot Park in California in a wreck that also killed Don Branson. He finished 11th in 1966 USAC National Championship points.

Complete USAC Championship Car results

References

External links
Dick Atkins at Champ Car Stats

1936 births
1966 deaths
Racing drivers from California
Racing drivers who died while racing
Sportspeople from Oakland, California
Sports deaths in California